Carlo Eduardo Acton (25 August 1829 – 2 February 1909) was an Italian composer and concert pianist. He is particularly remembered for his opera Una cena in convitto and for his sacred music compositions of which his Tantum ergo is the most well-known.

His father, Francis Charles Acton (1796-1865), was the youngest son of General Joseph Acton, younger brother of Sir John Acton, 6th Baronet. His mother Esther was a daughter of the Irish painter Robert Fagan.

References

1829 births
1909 deaths
Italian classical composers
Italian male classical composers
Italian opera composers
Male opera composers
19th-century Italian musicians
19th-century Italian male musicians